The 2019 Canadian Tire National Skating Championships  was held from January 13–20, 2019 in Saint John, New Brunswick. Organized by Skate Canada and sponsored by Canadian Tire, the event determined the national champions of Canada. Medals were be awarded in the disciplines of men's singles, women's singles, pair skating, and ice dancing on the senior, junior, and novice levels. Although the official International Skating Union terminology for female skaters in the singles category is ladies, Skate Canada uses women officially. The results of this competition were among the selection criteria for the 2019 World Championships, the 2019 Four Continents Championships, and the 2019 World Junior Championships.

Saint John was named as the host in January 2018. Competitors qualified at the Skate Canada Challenge held in Edmonton, Alberta in December 2018.

This was Saint John's first time hosting this event. The city had previously hosted Skate Canada International three times (2013, 1999, and 1995). They also hosted the 1998 World Junior Championships in December 1997.

Entries
The Skate Canada published the entry list on December 21, 2018.

Schedule
All competition events for the 2019 Canadian Tire National Skating Championships will be held at Harbour Station in Saint John, New Brunswick. Practices will be held at Qplex in Quispamsis, New Brunswick.
 The Harbour Station is the home of the Saint John Sea Dogs, of the Quebec Major Junior Hockey League, and the Saint John Riptide of the National Basketball League of Canada.

All times are in NST.

Medal summary

Senior

Junior

Novice

Senior results

Men

Women

Pairs

Ice dance

Junior results

Men

Women

Pairs

Ice dance

Novice results

Men

Women

Pairs

Ice dance

International team selections

World Championships
Skate Canada will announce the team for the 2019 World Championships after the championships.

Four Continents Championships
Skate Canada will announce the team for the 2019 Four Continents Championships after the championships.

World Junior Championships
Skate Canada will announce the team for the 2019 World Junior Championships after the championships.

References

External links
 

Canadian Figure Skating Championships
Figure skating
Canadian Figure Skating Championships
Canadian Figure Skating